The 1922 Giro di Lombardia was the 18th edition of the Giro di Lombardia cycle race and was held on 5 November 1922. The race started and finished in Milan. The race was won by Costante Girardengo of the Bianchi team.

General classification

References

1922
Giro di Lombardia
Giro di Lombardia